Pat Philley (24 April 1929 – 22 November 2019) was a former Canadian soccer player. He was a national champion with Vancouver City FC in 1950. He was Canada's starting centre half and captain during three matches in FIFA World Cup Qualifiers in 1957. He is an honoured member of the Canada Soccer Hall of Fame.

In the Pacific Coast League, Philley won two championships, the first with Vancouver City FC in 1953-54 and the second with Westminster Royals FC in 1956. He was a regular all-star selection, representing British Columbia or Vancouver in six of nine seasons from 1948–49 to 1956–57. He was part of the BC All-Stars team that won 2–0 over Tottenham Hotspur in Vancouver on 3 June 1957.

In 2014, Pat Philley was inducted into the Coquitlam Sports Hall of Fame.

Personal
Pat's brother Brian Philley also played in the Pacific Coast League and was likewise honoured by the Canada Soccer Hall of Fame. While the two brothers often played for different teams, they were both part of Vancouver City's 1953-54 championship team. The brothers also played together for Vancouver St. Andrews FC in 1958, on several provincial all-star teams, and for Canada in 1956 and 1957.

Honours

Club
Vancouver City FC
 Canada Soccer Championship for The Challenge Trophy: 1950
 Pacific Coast League: 1953-54

Westminster Royals FC
 Pacific Coast League: 1956

References

External links
 / Canada Soccer Hall of Fame
Canada Soccer Hall of Fame
Canada Soccer Records & Results

1929 births
Living people
Association football defenders
Canada men's international soccer players
Canadian soccer players
Canada Soccer Hall of Fame inductees
Soccer players from Vancouver
Vancouver City S.C. players